The Bergeron river (in French: rivière Bergeron) is a tributary on the south shore of Lake Mégantic which flows into the Chaudière River; the latter flows northward to empty on the south shore of the St. Lawrence River.

The Bergeron river flows in the municipalities of Val-Racine and Piopolis, in the Le Granit Regional County Municipality, in the administrative region of Estrie, in Quebec, in Canada.

Geography 

From its source, the Bergeron River flows in a forest zone over  divided into the following segments:
  towards the south-east, up to the limit of the municipality of Piopolis;
  easterly in Marston Township, to the limit of Clinton Township;
  eastward in Clinton Township, crossing route 263, to its confluence.

Toponymy 
The toponym "rivière Bergeron" was made official on December 5, 1968, at the Commission de toponymie du Québec.

See also 

 List of rivers of Quebec

References

External links 
 Article "Ducks unlimited takes possession of the marsh" - L'Écho de Frontenac - March 18, 2010 - This acquired area includes 4.7 km² of wetlands located at the head of Lac Mégantic

Rivers of Estrie
Le Granit Regional County Municipality